Gyan Deep Public School, Lalukheri is a private co-educational day school in Muzaffarnagar, India. It is run by Mr. P K Nirwal. The school was founded in the late 1990s and was the first English Medium school in the area. The school recently hit the jackpot after a student Itisha topped the district in class 12 exams of Session 2015-16. Since then 
it has achieved laurels in field of sports, academics and co-curricular activities in inter-school competitions with some students even qualifying for national level. The school is known for its emotional bond with all of its students.

History 
The school was opened by Mr PK Nirwal with the help of his brother "Arun Kumar" and some friends on his at his brother's land in the village of Lalu Kheri.

Education system
The school follows the Central Board of Secondary Education system.and high level goals

References 

Private schools in Uttar Pradesh
High schools and secondary schools in Uttar Pradesh
Muzaffarnagar
1990s establishments in Uttar Pradesh
Educational institutions established in the 1990s
Educational institutions in India with year of establishment missing